In mathematics, particularly matrix theory and combinatorics, a Pascal matrix is a matrix (possibly infinite) containing the binomial coefficients as its elements. It is thus an encoding of Pascal's triangle in matrix form. There are three natural ways to achieve this: as a lower-triangular matrix, an upper-triangular matrix, or a symmetric matrix. For example, the 5 × 5 matrices are:

There are other ways in which Pascal's triangle can be put into matrix form, but these are not easily extended to infinity.

Definition 

The non-zero elements of a Pascal matrix are given by the binomial coefficients:

such that the indices i, j start at 0, and ! denotes the factorial.

Properties 
The matrices have the pleasing relationship Sn = LnUn. From this it is easily seen that all three matrices have determinant 1, as the determinant of a triangular matrix is simply the product of its diagonal elements, which are all 1 for both Ln and Un. In other words, matrices Sn, Ln, and Un are unimodular, with Ln and Un having trace n.

The trace of Sn is given by

with the first few terms given by the sequence 1, 3, 9, 29, 99, 351, 1275, … .

Construction
A Pascal matrix can actually be constructed by taking the matrix exponential of a special subdiagonal or superdiagonal matrix. The example below constructs a 7 × 7 Pascal matrix, but the method works for any desired n × n Pascal matrices. The dots in the following matrices represent zero elements.

It is important to note that one cannot simply assume exp(A) exp(B) = exp(A + B), for n × n matrices A and B; this equality is only true when AB = BA (i.e. when the matrices A and B commute). In the construction of symmetric Pascal matrices like that above, the sub- and superdiagonal matrices do not commute, so the (perhaps) tempting simplification involving the addition of the matrices cannot be made.

A useful property of the sub- and superdiagonal matrices used for the construction is that both are nilpotent; that is, when raised to a sufficiently great integer power, they degenerate into the zero matrix. (See shift matrix for further details.) As the n × n generalised shift matrices we are using become zero when raised to power n, when calculating the matrix exponential we need only consider the first n + 1 terms of the infinite series to obtain an exact result.

Variants
Interesting variants can be obtained by obvious modification of the matrix-logarithm PL7 and then application of the matrix exponential.

The first example below uses the squares of the values of the log-matrix and constructs a 7 × 7 "Laguerre"- matrix (or matrix of coefficients of Laguerre polynomials

The Laguerre-matrix is actually used with some other scaling and/or the scheme of alternating signs.  
(Literature about generalizations to higher powers is not found yet)

The second example below uses the products v(v + 1) of the values of the log-matrix and constructs a 7 × 7 "Lah"- matrix  (or matrix of coefficients of Lah numbers)

Using v(v − 1) instead provides a diagonal shifting to bottom-right.

The third example below uses the square of the original PL7-matrix, divided by 2, in other words: the first-order binomials (binomial(k, 2)) in the second subdiagonal and constructs a matrix, which occurs in context of the derivatives and integrals of the Gaussian error function:

If this matrix is inverted (using, for instance, the negative matrix-logarithm), then this matrix has alternating signs and gives the coefficients of the derivatives (and by extension the integrals) of Gauss' error-function.  (Literature about generalizations to greater powers is not found yet.)

Another variant can be obtained by extending the original matrix to negative values:

See also
Pascal's triangle
LU decomposition

References

 G. S. Call and D. J. Velleman, "Pascal's matrices", American Mathematical Monthly, volume 100, (April 1993) pages 372–376

External links
 G. Helms Pascalmatrix in a project of compilation of facts about Numbertheoretical matrices
 G. Helms Gauss-matrix
 Weisstein, Eric W. Gaussian-function  
 Weisstein, Eric W. Erf-function 
 Weisstein, Eric W. "Hermite Polynomial". Hermite-polynomials 
 Endl, Kurt "Über eine ausgezeichnete Eigenschaft der Koeffizientenmatrizen des Laguerreschen und des Hermiteschen Polynomsystems". In: PERIODICAL VOLUME 65 Mathematische Zeitschrift Kurt Endl 
  (Related to Gauss-matrix).

Matrices
Triangles of numbers